Anchomenidius astur is a species of ground beetle which hail from the Platyninae subfamily that is endemic to Spain.

References

Beetles described in 1873
Endemic fauna of Spain
Beetles of Europe